Lúčnica nad Žitavou is a village and municipality in the Nitra District in western central Slovakia, in the Nitra Region. It arose in 1960 by merging of villages Martinová and Vajka nad Žitavou.

History
In historical records the village was first mentioned in 1113.

Geography
The village lies at an altitude of 137 metres and covers an area of 12.102 km². It has a population of about 905 people.

Ethnicity
The village is approximately 98% Slovak.

Facilities
The village has a public library and football pitch.

References

External links
http://www.lucnica.net

Villages and municipalities in Nitra District